Gilbert's grunter (Pingalla gilberti) is a species of freshwater ray-finned fish, a grunter from the family Terapontidae. It is endemic to Australia, where it is known from the Norman, Gilbert, and Flinders Rivers.

This grunter was described by Gilbert Percy Whitley in 1955, the specific name honours the English naturalist and explorer John Gilbert (1812-1845) after whom the type locality of this species, the Gilbert River, is also named.

References

Gilbert's grunter
Freshwater fish of Queensland
Endemic fauna of Australia
Taxonomy articles created by Polbot
Gilbert's grunter